Mirza Pandit Dhar was a prominent Kashmiri during the Afghan rule of Kashmir and Durrani Empire rule in the early 19th century. He is notable for his work with Birbal Dhar to end Afghan rule by challenging the acting governor. His brother was Dewan Sahaj Ram Dhar, a notable statesman in the region during the Mughal era. Both were members of the prominent Dhar family of Kashmir. Sahaj Ram's grandson was Mahanand Joo Dhar, another notable Kashmiri Pandit court official at the time.

References

Kashmiri people
History of Kashmir